The following are the telephone codes for Cameroon.

History 
On November 21, 2014, numbers were expanded from 8 to 9 digits, by prefixing with 2 or 6.

1 June 2007 - national renumbering to 8 digits, when 7-digit numbers were expanded to eight digits.

September 2004 - new mobile number ranges assigned.

26 October 2001 - national renumbering to 7-digit plan Cameroon's previous 6-digit national numbers were changed to 7 digits on 26 October 2001. There was no indication of a permissive dialling period.

Current calling formats

For calls within Cameroon, use just the 9 digits : 6640xxxxx
For calls from outside the country, add the code for Cameroon : '+237 6640xxxxx

Changes as of November 21, 2014

Previous changes in 2007

Previous changes in 2004
September 2004 - new mobile number ranges assigned

New mobile number ranges were assigned.

+237 5xxxxxx for MTN (plus existing +237 7xxxxxx range)

+237 6xxxxxx for Orange (plus existing +237 9xxxxxx range, formerly SCM)

Previous changes in 2001
26 October 2001 - national renumbering to 7-digit plan
Cameroon's previous 6-digit national numbers were changed to 7 digits on 26 October 2001. There was no indication of a permissive dialling period.

References

Cameroon
Telecommunications in Cameroon
Telephone numbers